H.M. Storey was an oil tanker built in 1921. She escaped an attack in California in 1941, but was sunk in an attack in 1943. She was owned by Standard Oil Company of California and built by Bethlehem Shipbuilding Corporation at the Alameda Works Shipyard with a hull# of 5312. She had a max. capacity of 306,115 gallons of fuel oil. Her keel was laid on January 19, 1921 and she was launched on September 28, 1921. Her sister ships are the SS F.H. Hillman and SS W.S. Rheem.  She had a range of 7,717 miles, 10,763 DWT and a 16,000 ton displacement. She had a length of 500 feet, a beam of 68.2 feet and a draft of 30 feet. She had 2,700 hp, made by a triple-expansion engine (twin 3-cylinder reciprocating steam engine) with dual shaft and 2 screws. She had three Scotch boilers. Named for Henry Martin Storey, vice president of the Standard Oil Company.

A Standard Oil Company first, the H.M. Storey was the first ship to bring oil from Estero, Florida to California in 1930.

World War II
The SS H.M. Storey was appropriated by the War Shipping Administration for World War II and operated with Merchant Marine and United States Navy Armed Guards to man the deck guns.   H.M. Storey was bringing oil to Los Angeles when on 22 December 1941 the Imperial Japanese Navy's submarine I-19 chased the ship for an hour.  Then 2 miles off Point Arguello California, 55 miles north of Santa Barbara, the captain of I-19, Narahara, fired three torpedoes at H.M. Storey, all missed. A US Navy plane saw the sub and dropped depth charges, the sub was forced to dive and end the attack.

H.M. Storey was bringing oil from Noumea, New Caledonia in the South Pacific Ocean to Los Angeles, when on May 17, 1943, Japanese submarine I-25 torpedoed and fired shells at the ship, killing two of the crew. The surviving 63 crew members (including all 15 Armed Guards) made it in to the ship's lifeboats before she sank. US destroyer USS Fletcher rescued the crew in the lifeboats and took them to Port Vila Efate, Vanuatu in the South Pacific.

Sister ships

SS F.H. Hillman
SS F.H. Hillman was an oil tanker ship built in 1921 with the same specifications as the SS H.M. Storey. She was owned by Standard Oil Company of California and built by Bethlehem Shipbuilding Corporation at the Alameda Works Shipyard. She was launched on Oct 12, 1921. She was named after F. H. Hillman, Director of Producing for Standard Oil Company. At completion she was the largest steel tank ship on the Pacific west coast and the largest owned by Standard Oil. Ship Number 221884221884.

SS W.S. Rheem
SS W.S. Rheem was an oil tanker ship built in 1921 with the same specifications as the SS H.M. Storey. She was owned by Standard Oil Company of California and built by Bethlehem Shipbuilding Corporation at the Alameda Works Shipyard with a hul# 5313. Her radio call sign  was WGAO. Her keel was laid on March 1, 1921 and she was launched on Nov. 10, 1921. She was named after William Rheem,  president of the Standard Oil Company of California (today's Chevron Corporation) from 1917 until his death on April 19, 1919. W.S. Rheem was the first tanker to take crude oil from Bahrain to Japan in 1934.

On August 31, 1943 the SS W.S. Rheem. was torpedoed by Japanese sub I-20. The W.S. Rheem was attacked 10 miles north of Bougainville Strait, near Espiritu Santo, at 15.51 S 167.02 E, no one was killed in the attack. At the time the ship had a crew of 40 merchants and 25 armed guards.  The crew began to abandon ship but the Master Gustaf Johnson saw that the forward bulkheads remained functional. By moving the cargo from the forward tanks to the stern tanks, the ship was able to move without sinking, so she delivered her oil cargo.  W.S. Rheem. made it to Espiritu Santo for temporary repairs to the large 20x25 foot hole on the port side in the dry cargo hold forward, by the crew of the USS Vestal.
The USS Wadsworth a Fletcher-class destroyer was sent out to hunt down Japanese sub I-20. On September 1, 1943 Wadsworth found the sub and dropped seven patterns of depth charges, I-20 was not heard or seen again. W.S. Rheem. was renamed twice: SS Shreveport and later SS Cities Services Koolmotor

See also
List of ships built in Alameda, California
List of shipwrecks in May 1943

References

 

1921 ships
Ships built in Alameda, California
Tankers of the United States
Ships sunk by Japanese submarines
World War II shipwrecks in the Pacific Ocean
World War II tankers of the United States
Maritime incidents in May 1943